Alfred Charles Kourak "Al" Nakak (born December 16, 1947) was an American politician and a Democratic member of the Alaska House of Representatives during the Tenth State Legislature representing District 22.

Personal life 

Alfred Nakak was born in Nome, Alaska and raised in St. Michael, Alaska. He studied political science at Columbia University and served in the Army National Guard.

Political career 

In 1972, Nakak was a write-in candidate for State Representative for Alaska's 20th district, but was defeated by Democrat Chuck Degnan.

In 1976, Nakak defeated Republican Bob Evans and Independent incumbent Larry T. Davis for State Representative for the 22nd district. He served on the Health, Education and Social Services Committee, the Rules Committee, and was Vice Chairman for the State Affairs Committee.

In 1978, Nakak lost the Democratic Primary to John G. Fuller.

Nakak later served as mayor of St. Michael, Alaska.

See also 
 List of Native American politicians

References

External links 
 Alfred Nakak at 100 Years of Alaska's Legislature

20th-century American politicians
Alaska National Guard personnel
Columbia University alumni
Democratic Party members of the Alaska House of Representatives
Native American state legislators in Alaska
People from Nome, Alaska
1947 births
2000 deaths